Lee Soon-ok (born 28 September 1955) is a South Korean former volleyball player who competed in the 1976 Summer Olympics.

References

External links

1955 births
Living people
South Korean women's volleyball players
Olympic volleyball players of South Korea
Volleyball players at the 1976 Summer Olympics
Olympic bronze medalists for South Korea
Olympic medalists in volleyball
Medalists at the 1976 Summer Olympics